2014 Regional League Division 2 Central & Western  Region is the 2nd season of the League competition since its establishment in 2013. It is in the third tier of the Thai football league system.

Changes from last season

Team changes

Promoted clubs
Ang Thong were promoted to the 2014 Thai Division 1 League.

Relocated clubs

Nonthaburi  re-located to the Regional League Central-West Division from the Bangkok Area Division 2013.
Prachuap moved into the Southern Division 2014.
Thonburi BG United moved into the  Bangkok & field Division 2014.

Expansion clubs

J.W. Group,  Ratchaphruek and  Thonburi City joined the newly expanded league setup.

Renamed clubs
 Futera Seeker renamed Seeker.

Stadium and locations

League table

References

External links

 

2014